Triple-deck theory is a theory that describes a three-layered boundary-layer structure when sufficiently large disturbances are present in the boundary layer. This theory is able to successfully explain the phenomenon of boundary layer separation, but it has found applications in many other flow setups as well, including the scaling of the lower-branch instability (T-S) of the Blasius flow, boundary layers in swirling flows, etc. James Lighthill, Lev Landau and others were the first to realize that to explain boundary layer separation, different scales other than the classical boundary-layer scales need to be introduced. These scales were first introduced independently by James Lighthill and E. A. Müller in 1953. The triple-layer structure itself was independently discovered by Keith Stewartson (1969) and V. Y. Neiland (1969) and by A. F. Messiter (1970). Stewartson and Messiter considered the separated flow near the trailing edge of a flat plate, whereas Neiland studied the case of a shock impinging on a boundary layer.

Then the thickness of each deck is

The lower deck is characterized by viscous, rotational disturbances, whereas the middle deck (same thickness as the boundary-layer thickness) is characterized by inviscid, rotational disturbances. The upper deck, which extends into the potential flow region, is characterized by inviscid, irrotational disturbances.

The interaction zone identified by Lighthill in the streamwise direction is

The most important aspect of the triple-deck formulation is that pressure is not prescribed, and so it has to be solved as part of the boundary-layer problem. This coupling between velocity and pressure reintroduces ellipticity to the problem, which is in contrast to the parabolic nature of the classical boundary layer of Prandtl.

See also
Flow separation
Boundary layer

References

Fluid dynamics